Tashina Morris is an American politician and former cosmetologist serving as a member of the Alabama House of Representatives from the 77th district. She assumed office on November 7, 2018.

Education 
Morris earned a Master of Science in leadership management from Amridge University and a PhD in criminal justice and safety studies from Capella University.

Career 
Morris worked as a cosmetology instructor and floor manager at Virginia College and a program director at the SouthEastern School of Cosmetology. She has since worked as a nonprofit director. Morris was elected to the Alabama House of Representatives and assumed office on November 7, 2018, succeeding John Knight. Morris was a candidate for the Alabama Senate in November 2020, placing fourth in the Democratic primary.

References 

Living people
Capella University alumni
Democratic Party members of the Alabama House of Representatives
Women state legislators in Alabama
African-American state legislators in Alabama
Year of birth missing (living people)
21st-century African-American people
21st-century African-American women